"China in Her Eyes" is a song by German music group Modern Talking and featuring American rapper Eric Singleton. It was released in January 2000 as the first single from the ninth studio album Year of the Dragon. Although, the song was of moderate success outside of Germany peaking only at No. 20 in Switzerland, No. 22 in Austria and No. 26 in Sweden, it managed to peak at No. 8 at the duo's home of Germany where it spent total of nine weeks on the single chart.

Track listing 
CD-Maxi Hansa 74321 72297 2 (BMG) / EAN 0743217229726 31.01.2000
 "China In Her Eyes" (Video Version) - 3:09
 "China In Her Eyes" (Vocal Version) - 3:46
 "China In Her Eyes" (Extended Video Version) - 4:49
 "China In Her Eyes" (Remix) - 4:25

Chart positions

References

External links

Songs about China
Modern Talking songs
2000 singles
Eurodance songs
Songs written by Dieter Bohlen
1999 songs
Ariola Records singles
Bertelsmann Music Group singles